Childish Things is a 2005 album by singer-songwriter James McMurtry (see 2005 in music).  It was awarded the 2006 Americana Music Association Album of the Year Award. The song "We Can't Make It Here" was named the best song of the 2000s decade by music critic Robert Christgau.

Track listing
"See the Elephant" (McMurtry) – 4:27
"Childish Things" (McMurtry)– 4.35
"We Can't Make It Here" (McMurtry) – 7:04
"Slew Foot" (featuring Joe Ely; written by Howard Hausey and James C. Webb) – 4:23
"Bad Enough" (McMurtry) – 4:32
"Restless" (McMurtry) – 3:52
"Memorial Day" (McMurtry) – 4:16
"Six Year Drought" (McMurtry) – 5:12
"Old Part of Town" (written by Peter Case) – 5:35
"Charlemagne's Home Town" (McMurtry) – 5:53
"Pocatello" (McMurtry) – 3:09
"Holiday" (McMurtry) – 6:30

Personnel
James McMurtry: lead vocal, acoustic and electric guitars, baritone guitar, mandolin, harmonica, piano, organ
Ronnie Johnson: bass guitar, backing vocals
Tim Holt: guitars
David Grissom: guitars
Daren Hess: drums, tambourine
Bukka Allen: piano, organ
Warren Hood: violin
Jon Blondell: trombone
Curtis McMurtry: saxophone
Randy Garibay, Jr.: backing vocals
Joe Ely: Co-lead vocal on "Slew Foot"
Chris Maresh: bass guitar on "Holiday"

Chart performance

References

External links
Childish Things information and lyrics at jamesmcmurtry.com

James McMurtry albums
2005 albums
Compadre Records albums